An Act for Regulating the Parishes was a 1677 act that confirmed the boundaries of the parishes of colonial Jamaica.

References 

Law of Jamaica
1677 in the Caribbean
Parishes of Jamaica